Krajków may refer to the following places in Poland:
Krajków, Lower Silesian Voivodeship (south-west Poland)
Krajków, Łódź Voivodeship (central Poland)
Krajków, Świętokrzyskie Voivodeship (south-central Poland)